The 2019–20 Armenian Cup was the 29th edition of the football competition between clubs in Armenia. FC Noah won the Cup for the first time. The tournament began on 6 September 2019 and ended on 10 July 2020.

Alashkert were the defending cup champions after defeating Lori the previous season by a score of 1–0.

First round
Three first round matches were played on 6 September 2019.

Second round
Eight second round matches were played between 1 November and 3 November 2019.

Quarter–finals
The quarter–final matches were played on 27 November 2019.

Semi–finals
Semi–final matches were played from 11 March to 24 June 2020.

Final

Scorers

8 goals:
 Ogana Louis - Ararat-Armenia

5 goals:
 Artyom Avanesyan - Ararat-Armenia

4 goals:
 Maksim Mayrovich - Noah

3 goals:
 Stepan Harutyunyan - West Armenia

2 goals:

 Thiago Galvão - Alashkert
 Petros Avetisyan - Ararat-Armenia
 Yusuf Otubanjo - Ararat-Armenia
 Narek Aslanyan - Gandzasar Kapan
 Vladimir Azarov - Noah
 Myroslav Deda - Torpedo Yerevan
 Yevgeni Kobzar - Urartu
 Nikita Andreyev - Van
 Dzambolat Khastsayev - Van
 Muslim Bammatgereev - Van

1 goals:

 David Ghandilyan - Alashkert
 Artur Avahimyan - Alashkert
 Anton Demenschin - Ani Yerevan
 Hovhannes Harutyunyan - Ararat-Armenia
 Yoan Gouffran - Ararat-Armenia
 Aleksandar Damčevski - Ararat-Armenia
 Ângelo Meneses - Ararat-Armenia
 Anton Kobyalko - Ararat-Armenia
 Gegham Harutyunyan - Gandzasar Kapan
 Mher Harutyunyan - Gandzasar Kapan
 Annan Mensah - Gandzasar Kapan
 Benik Hovhannisyan - Noah
 Dan Spătaru - Noah
 Dmitri Lavrishchev - Noah
 Alan Tatayev - Noah
 Aram Loretsyan - Sevan
 Areg Azatyan - Sevan
 Mher Sahakyan - Sevan
 Bohdan Riabets - Sevan
 Solomon Udo - Shirak
 Karen Avoyan - Torpedo Yerevan
 Wilfried Eza - Van
 Mher Harutyunyan - West Armenia
 Anton Kupchin - West Armenia
 Mikhail Zhabkin - West Armenia
 Andrei Zorin - West Armenia

Own goals:
 Roman Muradyan (6 September 2019 vs Torpedo Yerevan)
 Denis Volkov (3 November 2019 vs Ararat-Armenia)
 Alan Tatayev (10 July 2020 vs Ararat-Armenia)

See also
 2019–20 Armenian Premier League

References

External links
 soccerway.com

Armenian Cup seasons
Armenian Cup
Cup